Zhongcun may refer to:

Populated places
 Zhongcun, Yanling, a township in Yanling County, Zhuzhou, Hunan, China
 Zhongcun Township, Fujian, a township in Sanyun District, Sanming, Fujian, China
 Zhongcun Township, Huichang County, a township in Huichang County, Ganzhou, Jiangxi, China
 Zhongcun Township, Zhejiang, a township in Kaihua County, Quzhou, Zhejiang, China
 Zhongcun, Pingyi County a town in Pingyi County, Linyi, Shandong, China
 Zhongcun, Qinshui, a town in Qingshui County, Jincheng, Shanxi, China
 Zhongcun Subdistrict, a subdistrict of Panyu District, Guangzhou, Guangdong, China

Metro stations
 Zhongcun station (disambiguation)